Jodhpur is the second largest city in the Indian state of Rajasthan.

Jodhpur may also refer to:

Jodhpur National University, premier Indian private university
Jodhpur district, the district in Rajasthan where the city is located
Jodhpur Division, the division in Rajasthan where the district and city are located
Jodhpur (Lok Sabha constituency), a Lok Sabha parliamentary constituency in Rajasthan
Jodhpur Park, an upscale neighborhood of South Kolkata in Kolkata, West Bengal.
Jodhpur State was a princely state in the Marwar region from 1250 to 1949
Jodhpur, Gujarat, a city in the Indian state of Gujarat
Jodhpur boot, an ankle boot with a buckled strap
Jodhpurs, a style of trousers used in horse riding